Hamish Peacock (born 15 October 1990) is an Australian track and field athlete who competes in the javelin throw. He has competed at the Commonwealth Games, World Championships and the Summer Olympics.

Records and rankings
Peacock is four-time Australian Champion in the javelin. He is the fifth-best Australian of all time in the javelin, and is a 16 time Tasmanian champion and record holder. He is ranked 4th and 6th on the all-time Tasmanian records list in Discus and Shot put respectively. Peacock, who is coached by his father Evan, has trained in the Javelin throw, shot put and discus.

Competitions

Olympic Games 
Peacock represented Australia at the 2016 Olympic Games in Rio de Janeiro finishing in 25th place in Qualifying with a throw off 77.91m, Brazil.

Senior World Championships
Peacock was selected  to compete in the 2013 World Championships in Moscow in the javelin. He finished 14th out of 16 in qualification group A with a throw of 76.33m. His throw would have placed him 13th in qualification group B. Overall his throw placed him 26th out of 33 athletes in the qualification stages. This did not qualify him for the final and this was the end of Peacock's competition.

Peacock represented Australia in the 2015 World Championships in Beijing finishing 18th with a throw of 79.37m.

Peacock represented Australia at the 2017 World Championships in London finishing 14th with a throw of 82.46m which became at the time the longest throw to not qualify for a World or Olympic javelin final.

Commonwealth Games
Peacock was selected for the 2014 Commonwealth Games in Glasgow in the Javelin. He advanced to the finals after surpassing the 78.00m automatic qualification standard in qualifying with a distance of 79.08m. He then went on to win the bronze medal in the final with a throw of 81.75m.

Peacock won the Silver Medal in the men's javelin at the 2018 Commonwealth games on the Gold Coast with a throw of 82.59m.

Diamond League
Peacock has competed in a number of diamond league competitions following his debut in Doha in 2015. His best finish is 3rd place on two occasions in New York 2015 and London in 2016. His longest throw in a diamond league competition in 84.25m to finish 4th in Oslo in 2016 which remains his longest throw outside of Australia.

Youth & Junior World Championships
Peacock has competed in one World Youth Championships (2007) and one World Junior Championships (2008). He competed in the javelin at both competitions and made the final in each. In the 2007 World Youth Championships in Ostrava Peacock finished second in the javelin.

Family
Peacock is the older brother of fellow athlete Huw Peacock. Huw was selected, along with Hamish, to participate in the 2014 Commonwealth Games in Glasgow and the 2018 Commonwealth Games in Gold Coast. Huw's event is the Hammer throw. Huw is ranked 17th on the Australian all-time hammer throw rankings, with a personal best of 68.48m. Huw is two years younger than Hamish. Both were coached by their father Evan, and were based at the Domain Athletics Centre in Hobart, Tasmania.

Statistics

Personal bests

Progression

Achievements

References

External links
 
 
 
 
 
 

1990 births
Living people
Australian male javelin throwers
World Athletics Championships athletes for Australia
Athletes (track and field) at the 2014 Commonwealth Games
Athletes (track and field) at the 2018 Commonwealth Games
Commonwealth Games bronze medallists for Australia
Commonwealth Games medallists in athletics
Sportspeople from Hobart
Athletes (track and field) at the 2016 Summer Olympics
Olympic athletes of Australia
Australian Athletics Championships winners
Medallists at the 2014 Commonwealth Games
Medallists at the 2018 Commonwealth Games